Seif Seleman Rashidi (born 16 January 1957) is a Tanzanian CCM politician and member of parliament for Rufiji constituency since 2010. He is the Minister of Health and Social Welfare.

References

1957 births
Living people
Tanzanian Muslims
Chama Cha Mapinduzi MPs
Tanzanian MPs 2010–2015
Government ministers of Tanzania
Kinondoni Secondary School alumni
Alumni of Newcastle University